"The Way" is a song by New Zealand-British singer Daniel Bedingfield. It was released on 23 May 2005 as the third and final single from his second studio album, Second First Impression (2004). It was written by Bedingfield and produced by Bedingfield and Jack Puig.

The song peaked at number 41 on the UK Singles Chart.

Track listings
 UK CD1
 "The Way" - 3:19
 "Ain't Nobody" (duet with Natasha, live at the Brits) - 3:50

 UK CD2
 "The Way" - 3:19
 "Somebody Told Me" (Live from Radio 1) - 2:51
 "Holiness" (Re-Vocal version) - 6:41
 "The Way" (Music video) - 3:19

References

Daniel Bedingfield songs
2004 songs
2005 singles
Polydor Records singles
Song recordings produced by Jack Joseph Puig
Songs written by Daniel Bedingfield